Walter Höllerer (19 December 1922 – 20 May 2003) was a German writer, literary critic, and literature academic. He was professor of literary studies at the Technical University of Berlin from 1959 to 1988. Höllerer was a member of the Group 47, founder of the German literary magazine Akzente (1953) and the Literary Colloquium of Berlin (1963).

Biography
Walter Höllerer was born in Sulzbach-Rosenberg, Bavaria. He joined the Wehrmacht and became a soldier in 1942 during the Second World War. After 1945 he studied philology, philosophy, history, German studies, and comparative literature at the Universities of Erlangen–Nuremberg, Göttingen, and Heidelberg; in 1949 he earned a Doctor title in Gottfried Keller School. He worked as a lecturer assistant from 1954 to 1958 at the Goethe University Frankfurt. In 1954, he attended regular sessions with the 47, which was a group of young German authors who spoke about post-war Germany from the west BRD. During the early 1960s he moderated literature broadcasts on a free broadcasting channel of Berlin. From 1959 to his retirement in 1988 he was a professor of literary studies at the Technical University of Berlin. Meanwhile, he looked and researched a lot of professors from the United States.

During his research and work he published poems and novels, and put together critical statements for other literature works. In 1954 Höllerer put together the bimonthly literary magazine Akzente, one of the most important literature forums in the Federal Republic of Germany. In 1961 Höllerer published the newspaper Sprache im technischen Zeitalter ("Language in the Age of Technology"), in 1963 he founded the Literary Colloquium of Berlin. Through his hard work as a publisher and critic and a professor at TU Berlin he helped with the era of literature. In 1965 Höllerer married a photographer from Mangoldt, Renate, she previously had two sons. In 1977 he founded literary archives in Sulzbach-Rosenberg, which he then embedded the magazine Akzente into the archives.

In 1966 he was honored with the Fontane-Award and in 1993 together with Robert Creeley, the Horst-Bienek-award for lyrics and in 1994 the Rahel-Varnhagen-von-Ense-Medaille from Berlin. He was also honorary citizen and culture award-winning from the city Sulzbach-Rosenberg.

Robert Neumann harshly criticized Höllerer's leading role in the Group 47 and in the literary scene. He obtained research from Christoph König that Höllerer was a member of the NSDAP in 1941. Höllerer said that he has not gotten any confirmation for being in the NSDAP.

Höllerer was laid to rest at the Friedhof Heerstraße in Berlin. His widow Renate donated the archive Sulzbach-Rosenberg as a gift to Walter Höllerers research, which since 2007 has been developed and been researched even more. Since 19 April 2007, the Sulzbach-Rosenberg school changed its name to Walter-Höllerer-Realschule.

List of works

Non-fiction
 Gottfried Kellers "Leute von Seldwyla" als Spiegel einer geistesgeschichtlichen Wende. Eine Studie zur Geschichte der Novelle im 19. Jahrhundert. Erlangen 1949
 Zwischen Klassik und Moderne. Lachen und Weinen in der Dichtung einer Übergangszeit. Klett, Stuttgart 1958; new edition: SH, Köln 2005, 
 Theorie der modernen Lyrik. Dokumente zur Poetik 1. Rowohlt, Reinbek 1965
 Advanced new edition in 2 volumes: Hanser, München 2003, 
 Modernes Theater auf kleinen Bühnen. Literal Colloquium, Berlin 1965

Literary works
 Der andere Gast. Hanser, München 1952
 Gedichte. Beigefügt: Wie entsteht ein Gedicht? Suhrkamp, Frankfurt am Main 1964
 Systeme. Neue Gedichte. Literarisches Colloquium, Berlin 1969
 Die Elephantenuhr. Suhrkamp, Frankfurt 1973, ; Paperback ed. 1975, 
 Geschichte, die nicht im Geschichtsbuch steht. Kopp, Sulzbach-Rosenberg 1976
 Alle Vögel, alle. Eine Komödie in 2 Akten samt einem Bericht und Anmerkungen zum Theater. Suhrkamp, Frankfurt 1978, 
 Gedichte 1942–1982. Suhrkamp, Frankfurt 1982, 
 Oberpfälzische Weltei-Erkundungen. Weiden 1987,

As editor
 Junge amerikanische Lyrik (with Gregory Corso). Hanser, München 1960
 Transit. Lyrikbuch der Jahrhundertmitte. Mit Randnotizen. Suhrkamp, Frankfurt 1956
 Movens. Dokumente und Analysen zur Dichtung, bildenden Kunst, Musik, Architektur. Limes, Wiesbaden 1960
 Spiele in einem Akt. 35 exemplarische Stücke. Suhrkamp, Frankfurt 1961
 Ein Gedicht und sein Autor. Lyrik und Essay. Literal Colloquium, Berlin 1967
 Dramaturgisches. Ein Briefwechsel (with Max Frisch). Literal Colloquium, Berlin 1969
 Welt aus Sprache. Auseinandersetzung mit Zeichen und Zeichensystemen der Gegenwart. Art Academy, Berlin 1972
 Zurufe, Widerspiele. Aufsätze zu Dichtern und Gedichten (with Michael Krüger). Berlin Scientific Publishing, Berlin 1993,

Films
 Literatur im technischen Zeitalter, TV series, 13 films, Sender Freies Berlin, 1961/62, First episode: 13 November 1961
 Berlin stellt vor. TV series, 39 films, Sender Freies Berlin, 1962, First episode: 28 May 1962
 Modernes Theater auf kleinen Bühnen, TV series, 10 films, Sender Freies Berlin, 1964/65, First episode: 18 November 1964
 Der weiße Hopfengarten, 1966
 Ein Gedicht und sein Autor, TV series, 11 films, Sender Freies Berlin, 1966/67, First episode: 1 December 1966
 Die Alexanderschlacht, 1968
 Das literarische Profil von Prag, 1969
 Das literarische Profil von Stockholm, 1969
 Das literarische Profil von London, 1970
 Das literarische Profil von Rom, 1970
 Das literarische Profil von Berlin, 1971
 Vögel und Fluggespenster, 1973

Further reading
 Barbara Baumann-Eisenack: Walter Höllerer: Zu seinen Gedichten und seiner Lyrik-Anthologie "Transit". Literaturarchiv Sulzbach-Rosenberg 2002, 
 Helmut Böttiger, Lutz Dittrich: Elefantenrunden. Walter Höllerer und die Erfindung des Literaturbetriebs. Ausstellungsbuch, Texte aus dem Literaturhaus Berlin, Bd. 15, Berlin 2005, 
 Walter Höllerer: Memorandum zur Gründung eines Instituts "Sprache im technischen Zeitalter". In: Berliner Hefte zur Geschichte des literarischen Lebens, 8, 2008, S. 103–109
 Roland Berbig, Alexander Krüger: Ein Novum unter der Ägis eines Lehrstuhlinhabers. Walter Höllerer im Jahr 1959. In: Berliner Hefte zur Geschichte des literarischen Lebens, 8, 2008, S. 89–99
 Achim Geisenhanslüke, Michael Peter Hehl (ed.): Poetik im technischen Zeitalter. Walter Höllerer und die Entstehung des modernen Literaturbetriebs. Transcript, Bielefeld 2013,

External links
Biography as part of the Berlin Institute of Technology's 125th anniversary commemoration
Walter Höllerer  in the Sulzbach-Rosenberg (Höllerer-Nachlass) literature archive

References

1922 births
2003 deaths
20th-century German educators
20th-century German male writers
20th-century German non-fiction writers
20th-century philologists
21st-century German educators
21st-century German male writers
21st-century German non-fiction writers
21st-century philologists
Comparative literature academics
German-language poets
German-language writers
German literary critics
German literary historians
German literature academics
German magazine editors
German male non-fiction writers
German male poets
German military personnel of World War II
German newspaper editors
German philologists
Academic staff of Goethe University Frankfurt
Heidelberg University alumni
Knights Commander of the Order of Merit of the Federal Republic of Germany
Academic staff of the Technical University of Berlin
University of Erlangen-Nuremberg alumni
University of Göttingen alumni